Discothyrea is a genus of small ants in the subfamily Proceratiinae. The genus is distributed in the tropics and subtropics throughout the world, where they usually nest in rotten wood, in the leaf litter, or under stones. Little is known about their biology, but ants in this genus are thought to be specialist predators of arthropod eggs and have been observed storing eggs in their nests (probably spider eggs).

Species

Discothyrea antarctica Emery, 1895
Discothyrea banna Xu, Burwell & Nakamura, 2014
Discothyrea berlita Fisher, 2005
Discothyrea bidens Clark, 1928
Discothyrea bryanti (Wheeler, 1917)
Discothyrea clavicornis Emery, 1897
Discothyrea crassicornis Clark, 1926
Discothyrea denticulata Weber, 1939
Discothyrea diana Xu, Burwell & Nakamura, 2014
†Discothyrea gigas De Andrade, 1998
Discothyrea globa Forel, 1905
Discothyrea hewitti Arnold, 1916
Discothyrea horni Menozzi, 1927
Discothyrea humilis Weber, 1939
Discothyrea icta Weber, 1939
Discothyrea isthmica Weber, 1940
Discothyrea kamiteta Kubota & Terayama, 1999
Discothyrea leae Clark, 1934
†Discothyrea maya De Andrade, 1998
Discothyrea mixta Brown, 1958
Discothyrea neotropica Bruch, 1919
Discothyrea oculata Emery, 1901
Discothyrea patrizii Weber, 1949
Discothyrea poweri (Arnold, 1916)
Discothyrea remingtoni Brown, 1948
Discothyrea sauteri Forel, 1912
Discothyrea sculptior Santschi, 1913
Discothyrea sexarticulata Borgmeier, 1954
Discothyrea soesilae Makhan, 2007
Discothyrea sringerensis Zacharias & Rajan, 2004
Discothyrea stumperi Baroni Urbani, 1977
Discothyrea testacea Roger, 1863
Discothyrea traegaordhi Santschi, 1914
Discothyrea turtoni Clark, 1934
Discothyrea velutina (Wheeler, 1916)
Discothyrea yueshen Terayama, 2009

References

External links

Proceratiinae
Ant genera
Taxa described in 1861
Taxa named by Julius Roger